Aleksei Alekseyevich Veselkin (21 November 1961 in Moscow) is a Russian actor and TV game show presenter and Honoured Artist of Russia. He was a visible personality on television and in society magazines during the 1980s and 1990s, making a popular comeback in 2006 as the host of Sdelka? (Сделка "Deal?"), the Russian version of the American gameshow Deal or No Deal. During 2012 he was also a radio host on Radio Mayak show of Sergei Stillavin, but he and co-presenter Victoria Kolosova were dismissed after government watchdog Roskomnadzor upheld complaints against a controversial article by the presenters on cystic fibrosis. Veselkin returned to his previous position as a staff actor at the Russian Academic Youth Theater.

His son Aleksei Veselkin Jr (1990) is a well known teen actor: Veselkin Sr and Jr dubbed the voices of David Beckham and his son for the Russian version of Coca-Cola adverts.

Filmography
 1976 - Field move
 1983 - Romeo and Juliet
 1984 - Faith. Hope. Love
 1984 - It all begins with love
 1984 - Two Hussars (ru) based on Tolstoy's story
 1984 - Yegorka (ru)
 1985 - Road to the sea
 1986 - The right people (ru)
 1987 - Riders
 1988 - The Actress from Gribov (ru)
 1988 - Diskzhokey
 1988 - The Black Corridor
 1991 - Armavir (ru)
 1991 - A woman for all
 2001 - Doctors
 2002 - The joys and sorrows of Little Lord Fauntleroy
 2002 - Looking down
 2003 - Poor Nastya
 2005 - Not Born Beautiful (ru)
 2005 - Kulagin and Partners (ru)
 2007 - Sacvoyage with a bright future
 2010 - All for the best
 2012 - All the Afflicted

References

1961 births
Living people
Russian male film actors
Honored Artists of the Russian Federation
Male actors from Moscow
20th-century Russian male actors
21st-century Russian male actors
Soviet male film actors
Soviet television presenters
Russian game show hosts
Russian television presenters
Russian radio personalities
Russian theatre directors